The National Front for Liberation–Tahrir al-Sham conflict began on 1 January 2019 during clashes between Nour al-Din al-Zenki Movement and Hayat Tahrir al-Sham (HTS), after HTS launched an attack against the group in Darat Izza, Taqad, and Khan al-Asal fronts in rebel-held western Aleppo. The conflict ended on 10 January 2019, after the National Front for Liberation agreed to withdraw, allowing HTS to take over almost all of the remaining opposition-held areas of the Idlib pocket.

Background 
Hayat Tahrir al-Sham attacked Harakat Nour al-Din al-Zenki in response to recent assassinations of HTS' members in the area of Darat Izza on behalf of the al-Zenki movement.

Conflict

HTS attacks Nour al-Din al-Zenki
Clashes began on 1 January 2019 when HTS seized the Nour al-Din al-Zenki Movement controlled town of Darat Izza and several towns in Western Aleppo.

On 2 January Tahrir al-Sham fully captured Darat Izza, as well as Kafr Tin, Urum al-Kubra, Khan al-Assal, and Maklabis from the Nour al-Din al-Zenki Movement in western Aleppo. National front for Liberation released a statement announcing full mobilization of the body in order to repel Tahrir al-Sham's attacks, while Hurras al-Deen reportedly joined the clashes on Tahrir al-Sham's side. In Idlib province, the National Front for Liberation made advances in the eastern part of Saraqib and captured Tell Mansour checkpoint, as well as the village of Jaradah in southern Idlib. On the same day, the National Front for Liberation issued a directive ordering fighters positioned against the Syrian government and allied forces on the front lines not to withdraw from their positions in order to attack Hayat Tahrir al-Sham. Jaysh al-Islam also reportedly announced they would take part in fighting against Hayat Tahrir al-Sham from Afrin due to preexisting hostilities between HTS and JAI from East Ghouta.

On 3 January, according to the Syrian Observatory for Human Rights (SOHR), National Front for Liberation captured al-Zawiyah and al-Ghadqa town in Maarrat al-Nu'man District, after an attack on the sites of Tahrir al-Sham there, while the clashes continue between both parties in the area, the clashes continue in Babila area at the highway of Saraqib Maarrat al-Nu’man and other places in the southern countryside of Idlib. On the same day, according to pro-government sources, Hayat Tahrir al-Sham captured four towns in the Hama Governorate.

On 4 January, SOHR reported that clashes continued between Nour al-Din al-Zenki of National Liberation Front and Tahrir al-Sham, in the areas of Kafrentin, Senkhar, and the vicinity and outskirts of Darat Izza, that clashes renewed between National Liberation Front against Tahrir al-Sha in the areas of Qah and Salwah in the northern countryside of Idlib, and that Tahrir al-Sham took control over Jamiat al-Arman, in the opposition-held part of the western Aleppo countryside and captured the towns of Sinkhar, al-Hota and the 111th Regiment base from the Nour al-Din al-Zenki Movement. Tahrir al-Sham also reportedly entered the town of A’wejel after reaching an agreement with the local council there.

On the same day, the Russian Air Force reportedly launched airstrikes on Darat Izza and Base 111 which were recently captured by Tahrir al-Sham from the Nour al-Din al-Zenki movement.

On 5 January, SOHR reported that Tahrir al-Sham shelled Deir Ballut in Afrin countryside controlled by the Olive Branch forces of the Syrian National Army, while clashes continued between Tahrir al-Sham and National Front for Liberation near the border town of Atme. At dawn on Saturday, a large military convoy including tens of vehicles and members was brought by Hayyaat Tahrir al-Sham to areas in the southern countryside of Idlib, and negotiations took place with between Tahrir al-Sham and Nour al-Din al-Zenki movement about the latter withdrawing towards Afrin area.

On 6 January, Tahrir al-Sham entered the city of Atarib with military columns, after an agreement was reached after midnight of yesterday with factions of Thowwar al-Sham and Bayareq al-Islam. The agreement came after hours of violent clashes after an attack by Tahrir al-Sham to take control of the town. Meanwhile, according to SOHR, more than 400 fighters of Nour al-Din al-Zenki arrived in the areas controlled by the TFSA in the northeastern and northwestern parts of Aleppo, after they surrendered in the clashes against Tahrir al-Sham, with the expectation that the number of arrivals would increase to 500 fighters.

On 7 January, SOHR reported that the countryside of Idlib continued witnessing a mobilization by the rival factions in their areas of control, with the National Liberation Front factions continuing to reinforce their points and fortify them and bringing more fighters to the checkpoints, such as in the outskirts of Maarrat al-Nu'man, Ariha, and others. Tahrir Al-Sham brought reinforcements to Ariha area in the southern sector of Idlib countryside, as well as the areas of Bsonqul, Basames and Qarsaya; according to SOHR these reinforcements  come as a part of preparations by Tahrir Al-Sham to expand its control again within Idlib province. On the same day, the Rouse the Believers Operations Room, which includes Ansar al-Islam, Jabhat Ansar al-Din remnants, the Guardians of Religion Organization, and Ansar al-Tawhid, published a statement condemning the infighting and called for all issues and differences between HTS and the NLF to be resolved in a Sharia court. The NFL's 2nd Army also published a document renouncing the infighting.

Expansion into Al-Ghab Plain

On 8 January, clashes continued between Tahrir al-Sham and factions belonging to the National Front for Liberation in several sectors of Hama and Idlib countryside. National Front for Liberation launched a counterattack on positions of Tahrir al-Sham in Sfuhen town, which caused the advancement of the National Front for Liberation factions and besieging members of Tahrir al-Sham in several pockets in the town and injuring others, in addition to damaging several vehicles of Tahrir al-Sham, which is bringing more military reinforcements to the area. The clashes described as the most violent took place between both parties, in Tremla area and villages of Jabal Shashabo and Sahl al-Ghab, and the vicinity of Hbit and Abdin, which caused casualties in the ranks of both parties. While Tahrir al-Sham was able to achieve an important advancement in Sahl al-Ghab at the western country of Hama, and control one of the most important strongholds of Ahrar al-Sham faction, al-Ankawi village, according to SOHR it contains a headquarters large enough to accommodate tanks. Tahrir al-Sham also managed to advance and control each of Naqir, Abdin, Arinbeh, Stuh al-Dier, Tremla, and parts of Sfuhen, while heavy and medium machinegun targeting took place this morning on the outskirts of Maarat al-Nu’man and Ariha. On the same day, the NFL's Jaysh al-Nasr announced their neutrally in the conflict.

NFL surrender
On 9 January 2019, a truce was agreed to, with the NFL surrendering their last positions in southwestern Idlib to Tahrir al-Sham, with Jaysh al-Izza being the only other group allowed to operate in that area.

During the 9 day conflict, HTS captured around 90 areas, which gave them about 80% control over rebel territories in greater Idlib, or about 7200 km² out of about 8937 km², prior to the NFL's surrender. On 10 January, Tahrir al-Sham took control of the remaining territories that were formerly held by the NFL, with the exception of several towns in the Hama countryside.

Aftermath

On 30 April 2019, the Syrian Army launched a large-scale offensive on the Idlib pocket, beginning with an aerial bombing campaign, and then launching a ground offensive on 6 May. The offensive came after numerous HTS attacks, culminating with an attack by the HTS on 27 April that left 22 pro-government fighters dead.

See also

 al-Nusra Front–SRF/Hazzm Movement conflict
 October 2016 Idlib Governorate clashes
 Idlib Governorate clashes (January–March 2017)
 Idlib Governorate clashes (July 2017)
 East Ghouta inter-rebel conflict (April–May 2017)
 Syrian Liberation Front–Tahrir al-Sham conflict

References 

Conflicts in 2019
Aleppo Governorate in the Syrian civil war
Idlib Governorate in the Syrian civil war
Hama Governorate in the Syrian civil war
January 2019 events in Syria
Military operations of the Syrian civil war in 2019
Military operations of the Syrian civil war involving Tahrir al-Sham
Military operations of the Syrian civil war involving Ahrar al-Sham
Military operations of the Syrian civil war involving the Free Syrian Army
Military operations of the Syrian civil war involving Russia